Mark Ireland may refer to:
 Mark Ireland (artist)
 Mark Ireland (priest)